Edwin C. Hahn (August 2, 1888 – June 1, 1942) was an American sound engineer. He was nominated for an Oscar for Best Special Effects on the film Only Angels Have Wings at the 12th Academy Awards.

References

External links

1888 births
1942 deaths
American audio engineers
People from Maryland